Gray Television, Inc. is an American publicly traded television broadcasting company based in Atlanta, Georgia. Founded in 1946 by James Harrison Gray as Gray Communications Systems, the company owns or operates 180 stations across the United States in 113 markets. Its station base consists of all ranges of media markets, from as large as Atlanta, to one of the smallest markets, North Platte, Nebraska.

History
James H. Gray started his communication business with the purchase of The Herald Publishing Company (a company founded in 1897 to promote The Albany Herald, a newspaper that started publication in 1891), in 1946 after he returned from World War II. Gray launched WALB-TV in 1954. In 1960, Gray purchased WJHG-TV in Panama City, Florida, and followed it later in the decade with KTVE serving Monroe, Louisiana and southern Arkansas.

In 1986 Gray died, leaving his 50.5% share of the stock in a trust for his children with stipulation that they run the business together, sell their stock with each other or sell out together. This caused difficulties as two of the three wanted to sell with the third unable to purchase. In 1991, to break the stalemate, the board of directors had the company purchase 25% of their shares.

Gray Communication Systems
The company was then taken public on NASDAQ's small-cap market in the 2nd quarter 1992. The price per share dropped to $8. The company put itself-or any part up-for sale by the end of 1992. While the board of directors received about 40 offers, Bull Run Corporation purchased the remaining shares of the Gray siblings, who as part of the deal resigned from the board.

New management was put in place at all three TV stations. Bull Run Corporation, primarily owned by J. Mack Robinson, decided to make Gray a Southeast regional media company, expanding its focus beyond the state of Georgia. Gray purchased two TV stations (WKYT-TV and WYMT-TV) from the failed and government-seized Kentucky Central Insurance Company in September 1994 after a court challenge to the sale by Kentucky Central builder Garvice Kincaid.

In 1994 and 1995, Gray purchased two newspapers, the Rockdale Citizen (acquired May 31, 1994) and Gwinnett Post-Tribune (acquired January 1995; quickly renamed Gwinnett Daily Post) and seven advertising weeklies. In 1995, the company moved its stock listing to the New York Stock Exchange. By this time, Robinson, directly or through Bull Run, owned 44% of the company's stock. Gray had started to focus on its TV station segment over the newspaper holding while TV produced more income and the newspapers' income were declining. Just months after doubling the Daily Posts staff, one third were laid off and a quarter of The Albany Heralds staff followed in January 1996. Newspaper leaders resigned during this period–from the corporate president in late 1995 to the Citizens editor and publisher.

In 1996, Gray added additional TV stations while entering additional communication industry segments. The company was considered in 1996 by Fortune magazine as the 81st fastest growing company, having a 48% percent growth rate. WRDW-TV was purchased in January 1996. In September 1996 a basket purchase from First American Media, Inc., Gray got two TV stations (WCTV and WVLT-TV), Satellite and Production Business Services, which was renamed Lynqx Communications and PortaPhone paging business.

In August and September 1996, Gray raised additional operating funds by various means. On August 20, KTVE was sold for cash and accounts receivable. The company issued and sold Class B common stock (through a public offering), senior subordinated notes and preferred stock in September. Also, a new bank credit facility was arranged. This brought the company total to $534.5 million in available funds with $409.5 million directly available.

Also in September 1996, Ralph Gabbard, the newly named president and CEO, died from a heart attack at age 50. Robinson, Bull Run's chair, took over as interim CEO and president with Bull Run CEO Robert Prather as interim executive vice-president, acquisitions.

With its additional funds, Gray continued purchasing in 1997 with two announcements in January and February. The company bought Gulflink Communications, Inc., a transportable satellite uplink business based in Baton Rouge, Louisiana, in April 1997 to go along with Lynqx. With  Raycom Media acquiring a station from AFLAC Broadcast Group, Inc., forcing them to sell WITN-TV to Gray, which was finalized on August 1, 1997. The Gwinnett Daily Post increased circulation in 1997 through a deal with Genesis Cable Communications to provide the paper to its metro Atlanta subscribers at Genesis's expense.

In 1998, Gray started to expand beyond its Southeast region. As the company agreed to purchase the Busse Broadcasting Corporation, which owned KOLN, KGIN-TV and WEAU. Gray's ownership of a newspaper and TV station in Albany, Georgia while grandfathered was examined under the Media cross-ownership rule of the FCC due to this potential purchase. WALB was thus sold to Liberty Corp.'s Cosmos Broadcasting in August 1998.

In 2002, Robinson became chairman and CEO, his son-in-law Hilton Howell vice chairman, Prather president/COO and Jim Ryan senior vice president. They had Gray purchase 14 Benedek Broadcasting stations while that company was in bankruptcy.

Gray Television

In 2006, the company spun off its five daily newspapers and wireless messaging business into the newly formed Triple Crown Media, later (in 2010) renamed Southern Community Newspapers. A new strategy of purchasing stations in college towns or capitals was put into place.

The company had overpaid for a pair of stations and was over leveraged like many other station groups entering the Great Recession. Advertising revenues dropped. The twin problems caused its shares to trade at its lowest at 16 cents in 2008, thus the NYSE indicated they might delist the company. Loan covenants could have forced the company into default. Robinson stepped down with Howell replacing him in 2008.
 
On July 30, 2009, Gray was awarded a contract to manage seven Young Broadcasting-owned stations. Through December 31, 2012, Gray would earn $2.2 million and an opportunity to earn additional specified incentive fees if certain performance targets were exceeded.

Prather left the company in 2013 and Howell took over the president title. On November 4, 2013, Gray Television announced that it would purchase Yellowstone Holdings for $23 million, adding local stations: KGNS-TV, KGWN, KCWY, and KCHY-LP. Three weeks later, on November 20, Gray announced it would purchase Hoak Media and Parker Broadcasting for $335 million, and North Dakota's Fox affiliate KNDX/KXND for $7.5 million. As part of the deal, stations KAQY, KHAS-TV, and KXJB, were proposed to be sold to Excalibur Broadcasting and operated by Gray under a "local marketing agreements". On December 19, it was announced that stations KREX-TV and WMBB would be sold to Nexstar Broadcasting Group, while KFQX would be sold to Mission Broadcasting. On March 25, 2014, Prime Cities Broadcasting, owner of KNDX/KXND, requested that the FCC dismiss the sale of KNDX/KXND to Excalibur.

The sale was completed on June 13, 2014. However, some stations were forced to go off the air and their programming was moved to a multicast stream on adjacent channels, due to some stations being unable to receive regulatory approval, after the FCC's ruling on joint sales agreements. Those silent stations would then be sold off to minority interest, pending FCC approval.

On July 24, 2014, SJL Broadcasting announced that it would sell WJRT-TV and WTVG to Gray, for $128 million. The sale was completed on September 15.

In July 2015, Gray closed its accounting and human resources offices in Albany (housed in the same building as The Albany Herald), combining them with the corporate offices in Atlanta.

In September 2015, Gray announced that it would acquire the television and radio stations of Schurz Communications for $442.5 million. It also purchased KCRG-TV in Cedar Rapids, Iowa from the locally owned Gazette Company, who owned the station from its sign-on in 1953.

In January 2016, Gray Television opened a national news bureau in Washington, D.C., led by former APTV journalist Jacqueline Policastro. The bureau was designed to provide enhanced coverage of national political issues for Gray's local stations.

On May 13, 2016, Gray announced that it would acquire WDTV and WVFX in Clarksburg, West Virginia from Withers Broadcasting for $26.5 million. On June 3, 2016, it was announced that Gray would acquire two stations that were spun-off from the Nexstar-Media General merger; KWQC-TV in Davenport, Iowa and WBAY-TV in Green Bay, Wisconsin for $270 million. On February 16, 2017, Gray announced that it would acquire WABI-TV in Bangor, Maine and WCJB-TV in Gainesville, Florida from Diversified Communications for $85 million. On May 4, 2017, Gray announced its intent to acquire WCAX-TV in Burlington, Vermont from Mount Mansfield Television for $29 million.

In April 2017, Gray Television filed a lawsuit against Nick Prueher and Joe Pickett, founders of the Found Footage Festival, for fraud and copyright infringement, after having booked an appearance on the morning show of a Gray station as a fake strongman act, "Chop and Steele", and utilizing the footage during their show. The parties later agreed to a settlement.

On May 21, 2018, Gray Television entered into an agreement to acquire KNHL from Legacy Broadcasting for $475,000. Gray intended to turn KNHL into a satellite of its NBC affiliate KSNB-TV.

On June 25, 2018, Gray Television announced its intent to acquire Raycom Media for $3.65 billion, pending regulatory approval. The combined company would be led by Raycom's current president and CEO Pat LaPlatney, with current Gray CEO Hilton Howell acting as executive chairman and co-CEO. The acquisition, which Gray expected to close in late 2018, would give Gray 142 stations in 92 markets, making Gray the third-largest owner of television stations in the United States, with a total market share of 24%.

Although Gray foresaw that the acquisition would receive regulatory approval quickly, due to limited market overlap between the two companies and its still-relatively low total market reach post-acquisition. Gray would divest nine stations in markets where Gray and Raycom both already owned stations, including WTNZ, WTOL, KXXV, WTXL, WFXG, KWES-TV, WPGX, WSWG, and WDFX-TV. The sale was approved by the FCC on December 20, 2018. The deal was completed on January 2, 2019.

Gray announced on April 24, 2019, a joint venture with Grand Ole Opry Entertainment Group, a subsidiary of Ryman Hospitality Properties, a former owner of The Nashville Network. The services would consist of a broadcast diginet and an OTT streaming platform. The joint venture is based in Nashville under general manager Drew Riefenberger. Gray contributed distribution and marketing capabilities, multicast knowledge and affiliate Gray TV stations. The Circle TV network made its launch on January 1, 2020.

On February 1, 2021, Gray Television announced its intent to acquire all Quincy Media's broadcasting properties for $925 million in cash. To comply with federal regulators, Gray would divest Quincy stations in Tucson; Harrisburg, Illinois; Waterloo/Cedar Rapids, Iowa; and Madison, La Crosse, and Wausau in Wisconsin over to Allen Media Group. Gray's acquisition of Quincy Media was completed on August 2. 

In March 2021, Gray Television revealed plans to purchase a shuttered General Motors plant in Atlanta suburb Doraville, Georgia and transform the site into a media production community called Assembly. The "studio city" is set to include multiple film studios, as well as apartments, townhomes, a hotel, corporate offices, restaurants and retail space. In September 2021, Gray Television purchased Doraville-based Third Rail Studios for $27.5 million.

On May 3, 2021, Gray announced plans to buy the television division of Meredith Corporation for $2.7 billion. If approved, Gray would sell WJRT-TV to acquire competing station WNEM-TV, owned by Meredith. It is revealed that Allen Media Group would purchase WJRT-TV in Flint for $70 million. The sale was completed on December 1.

Assets
 Circle (2020) joint venture broadcast network with Opry Entertainment Group
Raycom Sports
RTM Studios
PowerNation (automotive hobby programming for syndication across many of Gray’s affiliates)
Tupelo Honey

Stations

Management of Young Broadcasting stations
On July 22, 2009, a New York bankruptcy judge approved a plan transferring ownership of Young Broadcasting and its stations to the company's secured lenders. The plan included Gray Television coming in as an outside party to advise on the operations of Young-owned stations in seven markets through December 2012. The new Young Broadcasting still held the final say on overall operations for their stations, including programming and personnel.

The former Young-owned stations managed by Gray Television include:
WKRN-TV in Nashville, Tennessee
WTEN in Albany, New York; repeater WCDC-TV in Adams, Massachusetts; and an SSA with WXXA-TV
WRIC-TV in Richmond, Virginia
WBAY-TV in Green Bay, Wisconsin
KWQC-TV in Davenport, Iowa
KELO-TV in Sioux Falls, South Dakota and its translators throughout South Dakota
KLFY-TV in Lafayette, Louisiana

Young Broadcasting would retain ownership of all its stations, including three stations that Gray would not operate: KRON-TV in San Francisco, California, WATE-TV in Knoxville, Tennessee, and WLNS-TV in Lansing, Michigan, the latter two due to Gray already owning stations in those markets. Gray considered the possibility of purchasing the Young stations if the group went on the market.

The agreement ended without any further extensions on December 31, 2012, and Young agreed to a merger with Media General in mid-2013. Gray would eventually purchase KWQC and WBAY outright when Nexstar Broadcasting Group acquired Media General in 2017, as Nexstar already owned WHBF-TV and WFRV-TV in each market. At that time, Gray had already acquired Sioux Falls rival station KSFY. Gray would also re-enter the Richmond market when it bought WWBT in 2019, following its merger with Raycom Media, and would also re-enter the Nashville market in 2021 with WSMV-TV after acquiring the television assets of Meredith Corporation.

Washington News Bureau
By January 20, 2016, Gray had set up their Washington News Bureau by Jacqueline Policastro to enable stations to get interviews with U.S. Senators and Representatives serving their communities. The bureau cooperates with Lilly Broadcasting's Washington bureau, previously started by Policastro, and is located at the NBC News Capitol Hill Bureau, 400 N. Capitol Street. In February 2019, Gray announced that award-winning journalist Greta Van Susteren has joined the company as its Chief National Political Analyst. Gray then announced in April 2019 Greta Van Susteren as host of a Sunday morning syndicated show, Full Court Press with Greta Van Susteren, which was launched in September 2019.

References

External links

Gray DC Bureau
InvestigateTV

American companies established in 1946
1946 establishments in Georgia (U.S. state)
 
Companies listed on the New York Stock Exchange
Television broadcasting companies of the United States
Companies based in Atlanta
Mass media companies established in 1946
1992 initial public offerings